The 1999 MTV Movie Awards were hosted by Lisa Kudrow. Musical performances included Kid Rock, Robbie Williams, and Will Smith with Dru Hill, Nine Inch Nails and Kool Moe Dee.

Performers
 Will Smith — "Wild Wild West"
 Kid Rock — "Bawitdaba"
 Robbie Williams — "Millennium"

Presenters
Courtney Love and James Van Der Beek — presented Best On-Screen Duo
Whitney Houston — introduced Will Smith
Tobey Maguire and Heather Graham — presented Breakthrough Female
Hugh Grant and Salma Hayek — presented Best Comedic Performance
Dylan McDermott and Kate Hudson — presented Breakthrough Male
Jay-Z and Rebecca Romijn — presented Best Action Sequence
Catherine Zeta-Jones and Ricky Martin — presented Best Kiss
Omar Epps and Taye Diggs — introduced Kid Rock
Samuel L. Jackson and Jake Lloyd — presented Best Villain
Keri Russell and Brendan Fraser — presented Best Female Performance
Rose McGowan and Jon Stewart — presented Best Fight
Ben Affleck and Kevin Smith — presented Best New Filmmaker
Lisa Kudrow — presented Best Dramatic Pause
Shawn Hatosy and Rachael Leigh Cook — introduced Robbie Williams
Janeane Garofalo and Mike Myers — presented Best Male Performance
Keanu Reeves and Jennifer Lopez — presented Best Movie

Awards

Best Movie 
There's Something About Mary
 Armageddon
 Saving Private Ryan
 Shakespeare in Love
 The Truman Show

Best Male Performance 
Jim Carrey – The Truman Show
 Ben Affleck – Armageddon
 Tom Hanks – Saving Private Ryan
 Adam Sandler – The Waterboy
 Will Smith – Enemy of the State

Best Female Performance 
Cameron Diaz – There's Something About Mary
 Jennifer Love Hewitt – Can't Hardly Wait
 Jennifer Lopez – Out of Sight
 Gwyneth Paltrow – Shakespeare in Love
 Liv Tyler – Armageddon

Breakthrough Male 
James Van Der Beek – Varsity Blues
 Ray Allen – He Got Game
 Joseph Fiennes – Shakespeare in Love
 Josh Hartnett – Halloween H20: 20 Years Later
 Chris Rock – Lethal Weapon 4

Breakthrough Female 
Katie Holmes – Disturbing Behavior
 Cate Blanchett – Elizabeth
 Brandy – I Still Know What You Did Last Summer
 Rachael Leigh Cook – She's All That
 Catherine Zeta-Jones – The Mask of Zorro

Best On-Screen Duo 
Jackie Chan and Chris Tucker – Rush Hour
 Ben Affleck and Liv Tyler – Armageddon
 Nicolas Cage and Meg Ryan – City of Angels
 Freddie Prinze Jr. and Rachael Leigh Cook – She's All That
 Ben Stiller and Cameron Diaz – There's Something About Mary

Best Villain 
Matt Dillon – There's Something About Mary / Stephen Dorff – Blade (tie)
 Chucky – Bride of Chucky
 Jet Li – Lethal Weapon 4
 Rose McGowan – Jawbreaker

Best Comedic Performance 
Adam Sandler – The Waterboy
 Cameron Diaz – There's Something About Mary
 Chris Rock – Lethal Weapon 4
 Ben Stiller – There's Something About Mary
 Chris Tucker – Rush Hour

Best Song From a Movie 
Aerosmith — "I Don't Want to Miss a Thing" (from Armageddon)
 Aaliyah — "Are You That Somebody?" (from Dr. Dolittle)
 Goo Goo Dolls — "Iris" (from City of Angels)
 Green Day — "Nice Guys Finish Last" (from Varsity Blues)
 Jay-Z — "Can I Get A..." (from Rush Hour)

Best Kiss 
Gwyneth Paltrow and Joseph Fiennes – Shakespeare in Love
 George Clooney and Jennifer Lopez – Out of Sight
 Matt Dillon, Denise Richards and Neve Campbell – Wild Things
 Jeremy Irons and Dominique Swain – Lolita
 Ben Stiller and Cameron Diaz – There's Something About Mary

Best Action Sequence 
Asteroid Destroys New York City – Armageddon
 Gibson/Glover Car Chase on Freeway and Through Building – Lethal Weapon 4
 Car Chase in France with De Niro Pursuing Natasha McElhone – Ronin
 Tom Hanks and Company Land on Normandy Beach – Saving Private Ryan

Best Fight 
Ben Stiller vs. Puffy the Dog (created by Industrial Light & Magic) – There's Something About Mary
 Wesley Snipes vs. Vampires – Blade
 Antonio Banderas vs. Catherine Zeta-Jones – The Mask of Zorro
 Jackie Chan and Chris Tucker vs. Chinese Gang – Rush Hour

Best New Filmmaker 
 Guy Ritchie – Lock, Stock and Two Smoking Barrels

External links
 MTV Movie Awards: 1999  at the Internet Movie Database
  1999 MTV Movie Awards page.

 1999
Mtv Movie Awards